The Holland Ladies Tour is a women's elite professional road bicycle racing stage race held annually in September since 1998 in the Netherlands. It's a tour with 6 or 7 stages. For sponsorship reasons the 2011 race was officially titled the Profile Ladies Tour, the 2012 race the BrainWash Ladies Tour, from 2013 to 2019 as the Boels Rental Ladies Tour, and in 2021 as the Simac Ladies Tour. The race was not held in 2020.

Past winners

References 

 
Recurring sporting events established in 1998
1998 establishments in the Netherlands
Cycle races in the Netherlands
Women's road bicycle races
UCI Women's World Tour races